The army rank of captain (from the French ) is a commissioned officer rank historically corresponding to the command of a company of soldiers. The rank is also used by some air forces and marine forces, but usually refers to a more senior officer. Today, a captain is typically either the commander or second-in-command of a company or artillery battery (or United States Army cavalry troop or Commonwealth squadron). In the Chinese People's Liberation Army, a captain may also command a company, or be the second-in-command of a battalion.

In some militaries, such as United States Army and Air Force and the British Army, captain is the entry-level rank for officer candidates possessing a professional degree, namely, most medical professionals (doctors, pharmacists, dentists) and lawyers. In the U.S. Army, lawyers who are not already officers at captain rank or above enter as lieutenants during training, and are promoted to the rank of captain after completion of their training if they are in the active component, or after a certain amount of time, usually one year from their date of commission as a lieutenant, for the reserve components.

The rank of captain should not be confused with the naval rank of captain, or with the UK-influenced air force rank of group captain, both of which are equivalent to the army rank of colonel.

History

The term ultimately goes back to Late Latin  meaning "chief, prominent"; in Middle English adopted as capitayn in the 14th century, from Old French capitaine.

The military rank of captain was in use from the 1560s, referring to an officer who commands a company. The naval sense, an officer who commands a man-of-war, is somewhat earlier, from the 1550s, later extended in meaning to "master or commander of any kind of vessel".
A captain in the period prior to the professionalization of the armed services of European nations subsequent to the French Revolution, during the early modern period, was a nobleman who purchased the right to head a company from the previous holder of that right. He would in turn receive money from another nobleman to serve as his lieutenant. The funding to provide for the troops came from the monarch or his government; the captain had to be responsible for it. If he was not, or was otherwise court-martialed, he would be dismissed ("cashiered"), and the monarch would receive money from another nobleman to command the company. Otherwise, the only pension for the captain was selling the right to another nobleman when he was ready to retire.

Air forces
Many air forces, such as the United States Air Force, use a rank structure and insignia similar to those of the army.

However, the United Kingdom's Royal Air Force, many other Commonwealth air forces and a few non-Commonwealth air forces use an air force-specific rank structure in which flight lieutenant is OF-2. A group captain is derived from the naval rank of captain.

Canada is a unique exception. Due to the unification of the Canadian Armed Forces in 1968, the air force rank titles are the same as those of the Canadian Army. However, like their Commonwealth counterparts, rank braids are pearl grey and increase in half strip increments. The decision was taken not to restore the historic rank titles for the RCAF due to it being deemed 'too confusing'.

Insignia

See also
Kapitan (rank)
Captain (United Kingdom)
Captain (United States)
Senior captain
Staff captain
 Katepano
 Rittmeister

Notes

References

Military ranks
Military ranks of Australia
Military ranks of Canada
Military ranks of Ireland
Pakistan Army ranks
Military ranks of Russia
Military ranks of Singapore
Military ranks of Sweden
Military ranks of the Nepali Army
Military ranks of the Indian Army